The 2010 Northeast Conference men's basketball tournament took place March 4, 7, and 10, 2010 on campus sites. One semifinal game was televised on MSG Network, and the finals were seen on ESPN2. The winner, Robert Morris, receives the NEC's automatic berth in the 2010 NCAA tournament. The #1 seed Quinnipiac will receive an automatic bid to the 2010 NIT as the regular season champions. This is Robert Morris's NEC leading 7th NEC tournament championship.

Format
For the sixth straight year, the NEC Men's Basketball Tournament will consist of an eight-team playoff format with all games played at the home of the higher seed. After the quarterfinals, the teams will be reseeded so the highest remaining seed plays the lowest remaining seed in the semifinals. This is Bryant's first year at D-I and is ineligible for any post-season tournaments and thus not allowed to participate.

Bracket

All-tournament team
Tournament MVP in bold.

References

Tournament
Northeast Conference men's basketball tournament
Northeast Conference men's basketball tournament
Northeast Conference men's basketball tournament